The Kokoamu Greensand is a geological formation found in New Zealand.  It is a fossil-bearing, late Oligocene, greensand rock unit of the eastern South Island, especially the Waitaki District of North Otago and the southern Canterbury region.  The formation was named by geologist Maxwell Gage in the 1950s. In North Otago it underlies the thicker and harder Otekaike Limestone. The formation gets its green colour from the mineral glauconite which forms slowly on the ocean floor.

Fossil content 
The formation was laid down in shallow seas some 26-30 million years ago.  It contains abundant microfossils of foraminifera, ostracods and coccoliths, those of larger marine invertebrates such as the shells of brachiopods, gastropods and scallops, as well as corals, echinoderms, and crustaceans.  Vertebrates found in the formation include fish, penguins and cetaceans.  Many of the fossils discovered in the formation are held in the Geology Museum of the University of Otago.

Penguins

 Archaeospheniscus lopdelli, A. lowei
 Duntroonornis parvus
 Kairuku waitaki, K. grebneffi, K. waewaeroa
 Korora oliveri
 Manu antiquus
 Palaeeudyptes
 Platydyptes amiesi, P. marplesi, P. novaezealandiae

Cetaceans

 Awamokoa tokarahi
 Horopeta
 Mammalodon hakataramea
 Matapanui waihao
 Tohoraata waitakiensis
 Tokarahia lophocephalus
 Whakakai waipata

See also 

 Geology of Canterbury, New Zealand

References

Further reading 
 R. W. Boessenecker and R. E. Fordyce. 2016. A new eomysticetid from the Oligocene Kokoamu Greensand of New Zealand and a review of the Eomysticetidae (Mammalia, Cetacea). Journal of Systematic Palaeontology
 R. E. Fordyce. 2002. Oligocene origins of skim-feeding right whales: A small archaic balaenid from New Zealand. Journal of Vertebrate Paleontology 22(3):54A
 D. T. Ksepka, R. E. Fordyce, T. Ando and C. M. Jones. 2012. New fossil penguins (Aves, Sphenisciformes) from the Oligocene of New Zealand reveal the skeletal plan of stem penguins. Journal of Vertebrate Paleontology 32(2):235-254
 D. MacKinnon, S. S. Beus, and D.L. Lee. 1993. Brachiopod fauna of the Kokoamu Greensand (Oligocene), New Zealand. New Zealand Journal of Geology and Geophysics 36:327-347
 B. J. Marples. 1956. Cetotheres (Cetacea) from the Oligocene of New Zealand. Proceedings of the Zoological Society of London 126(4):565-580 
 Y. Tanaka and R. E. Fordyce. 2016. Awamokoa tokarahi, a new basal dolphin in the Platanistoidea (late Oligocene, New Zealand). Journal of Systematic Palaeontology
 C. H. Tsai and R. E. Fordyce. 2016. Archaic baleen whale from the Kokoamu Greensand: earbones distinguish a new late Oligocene mysticete (Cetacea: Mysticeti) from New Zealand. Journal of the Royal Society of New Zealand

Geologic formations of New Zealand
Oligocene Oceania
Chattian Stage
Sandstone formations
Paleontology in New Zealand
Rock formations of Otago
Rock formations of Canterbury, New Zealand
Waitaki District